Giacomo Filippo Durazzo III (1719–1812) was the head of the wealthiest 18th-century family in Genoa, Italy, and a notable naturalist and bibliophile. He was instrumental in organizing the natural history collections in the University of Genoa and the city's Civic Museum of Natural History.

Durazzo was the son of Marcello Durazzo (1703–1787) and Clelia Durazzo (1709–1782). His descendants include Clelia Durazzo Grimaldi and Ignazio Alessandro Pallavicini, both naturalists in their own right.

Over the course of 30 years, Durazzo collected more than 4,000 books, as well as many specimens of minerals, fossils, shells, physical and electrical devices, etc. In the 1780s Durazzo established a natural history cabinet and a laboratory in his private villa of Cornigliano. Its collection was documented by English botanist James Edward Smith in 1787, but after Durazzo's death, it was not preserved.

References 
 A. Valenti Durazzo, I Durazzo da schiavi a dogi della Repubblica di Genova, 2004.
A.Valenti Durazzo "Il Fratello del Doge. Giacomo Durazzo un illuminista alla Corte degli Asburgo tra Mozart, Casanova e Gluck", 2012.
 O Raggio, Collecting nature in Genoa, 1780 - 1870. From aristocratic patronage to civic patrimony, Oxford Journal of the History of Collections, 10(1):41-59, 1998.
 O. Raggio,Storia di una passione. Cultura aristocratica e collezionismo alla fine dell'ancien régime, Marsilio, 2000.

External links 
 History of the Durazzos
 Oxford Journal of the History of Collections

1719 births
1812 deaths
Italian naturalists
18th-century Italian people
19th-century Italian people
Scientists from Genoa